The 1994–95 season was the fourth season of competitive football in Ukraine.

National team

Premier League

League table

First League

League table

Second League

League table

External links
 Complete results of all national team matches

 
Seasons in Ukrainian football